The year 1846 in architecture involved some significant architectural events and new buildings.

Events
 December 23 – The Nizamat Imambara, in Murshidabad, India built by Nawab Siraj ud-Daulah, having been partially burnt down in 1842, is completely destroyed in another fire.

Buildings and structures

Buildings opened

 January 16 – Shree Govindajee Temple in Imphal, Manipur, commissioned by Raja Nara Singh.
 March 7 – Grace Church (Manhattan), New York City, United States, designed by James Renwick, Jr., is consecrated.
 May 12 – Our Lady of Lebanon Maronite Cathedral (Brooklyn) holds its first service.
 May 21 – Trinity Church (Manhattan) in Wall Street, New York City, designed by Richard Upjohn, is consecrated.
 July 30 – Albert Dock in Liverpool, England, officially opened by Prince Albert, husband of Queen Victoria.
 August 4 – Dublin Kingsbridge railway station in Ireland, designed by Sancton Wood.
 August 31 – St Giles' Catholic Church, Cheadle in England, designed by Augustus Pugin, is consecrated.
 September 1 – Pasig River Light, the first lighthouse erected in the Philippines, is lit.
 September 22 – Lancaster Castle railway station in England, designed by William Tite.
 December 24 – Needham, Stowmarket and Thurston railway stations in Suffolk, England, designed by Frederick Barnes (station buildings completed 1847/9).

Buildings completed

 June — Grace Church, Providence, Rhode Island, designed by Richard Upjohn, is completed (except for the spire, which was not finished until 1860). 
 Macau Government House, built as a private home by Macanese architect Thomaz de Aquino.
 Murney Tower, Kingston, Ontario, Canada.
 Newstead House, Brisbane, Australia.
 Notre-Dame de Bon-Port, Nantes, France, designed by Seheult and Joseph-Fleury Chenantais.
 Llandinam Bridge in Montgomeryshire, Wales, designed by Thomas Penson.

Awards
 Grand Prix de Rome, architecture: Alfred-Nicolas Normand.

Births
 September 4 – Daniel Burnham, American architect and urban designer (died 1912)
 James E. Ware, American architect, originator of the "dumbbell plan" for New York City tenements (died 1918)

Deaths
 January 22 – Louis Baltard, French architect and engraver (born 1764)

References

Architecture
Years in architecture
19th-century architecture